Paul Rothley (24 February 1926 – 14 May 2003) was a French rower. He competed in the men's coxless pair event at the 1948 Summer Olympics.

References

External links
 

1926 births
2003 deaths
French male rowers
Olympic rowers of France
Rowers at the 1948 Summer Olympics
Sportspeople from Strasbourg